The 2022–23 Syrian Premier League season is the 51st since its establishment in 1966. This season's league featured one stage. It pitted one group of 12 teams and kicked off on 9 September 2022. Tishreen are the defending champions, having won the previous season championship. The league is operated by the SFA.

The regular season is being played as a round-robin tournament. A total of 12 teams participate, 10 of which competed in the league campaign during the previous 2021–2022 season.  
The league started a week later because on 1 September 2022, mourning was declared for the late president of Tishreen SC Tarek Zainy, who died in a car accident. Due to the 2022 FIFA World Cup, the last round before stoppage will be held on 21–22 October. The league will resume games on 9 December.

Teams

Team changes
Twelve teams will compete in the league for the first time since 1994. Ten teams from the previous season and two teams promoted from the Syrian League 1st Division. 

Al-Majd SC and Al-Jazeera SC (promoted to the top flight for the fourth time) earned an automatic promotion thanks to the victory of the 1st Division, replacing Al-Shorta (relegated after sixteen years in the top flight) and Al-Horgelah SC, who finished last in the 2021–22 Syrian Premier League.

Stadiums and locations

1:  Al-Karamah and Al-Wathba also use Bassel al-Assad  Stadium (25,000 seats) as a home stadium.

League table

Results

Results by round

Season statistics

Top scorers
Updated as of 3 February 2023.

See also
2022–23 Syrian Cup
Syrian League 1st Division
2023–24 AFC Champions League
2023–24 AFC Cup

References

Syrian Premier League seasons
Syria